In the United States, a path (or pathway) to citizenship is proposed immigration reform providing a process whereby undocumented immigrants can become citizens.

Obama administration
During his 2008 presidential campaign, Barack Obama promised to support a path to citizenship for undocumented immigrants, whereby such immigrants, if they were in good standing, could pay a fine in return for gaining the opportunity to become citizens. In 2013, Obama called on Congress to include a path to citizenship in any immigration reform bill it passed. The Border Security, Economic Opportunity, and Immigration Modernization Act of 2013, passed by the United States Senate on June 27, 2013, would create a 13-year path to citizenship for millions of undocumented immigrants, a path that would require them to pass several security checks before they can get a green card.

Public opinion
Multiple polls conducted during Obama's presidency have found that a large majority of Americans support a path to citizenship, but with stronger support among Democrats than among Republicans. A poll conducted in February 2017 found that 87% of Democrats and 69% of Republicans supported a path to citizenship, as did 72% of President Donald Trump's supporters.

See also

 Immigration reform in the United States

References

Illegal immigration to the United States
Citizenship of the United States